The 2010 WNBA season is the 14th season for the New York Liberty of the Women's National Basketball Association.

Transactions

Dispersal draft
Based on the Liberty's 2009 record, they would pick 1st in the Sacramento Monarchs dispersal draft. The Liberty picked Nicole Powell.

WNBA Draft
The following are the Liberty's selections in the 2010 WNBA Draft.

Transaction log
May 5, 2009: The Liberty traded their first round pick in the 2010 Draft to the Los Angeles Sparks in exchange for Sidney Spencer.
March 30: The Liberty traded Shameka Christon and Cathrine Kraayeveld to the Chicago Sky in exchange for the Sky's second-round pick in the 2010 Draft. The Liberty also received Cappie Pondexter and Kelly Mazzante from the Phoenix Mercury as part of the three-team trade.
April 6: The Liberty waived Loree Moore.
April 8: The Liberty waived Kelly Mazzante.
April 20: The Liberty released Ashley Battle.
April 22: The Liberty signed free agent Taj McWilliams-Franklin.
April 23: The Liberty signed Brandie Hoskins, Laine Selwyn, Tamara James, April Phillips, Katie Mattera and Erica Williamson to training camp contracts.
April 28: The Liberty waived Brandie Hoskins.
May 3: The Liberty waived Laine Selwyn.
May 4: The Liberty waived Katie Mattera.
May 9: The Liberty waived Cory Montgomery and Tamara James.
May 12: The Liberty traded Ashley Houts to the Washington Mystics in exchange for Nikki Blue.
June 14: The Liberty traded Tiffany Jackson to the Tulsa Shock in exchange for Plenette Pierson.

Trades

Free agents

Additions

Subtractions

Roster

Depth

Season standings

Schedule

Preseason

|- align="center" bgcolor="ffbbbb"
| 1 || May 5 || 11:30am || @ Washington || 60-65 || McWilliams-Franklin (12) || McWilliams-Franklin (11) || Mitchell (4) || Verizon Center  7,152 || 0-1
|- align="center" bgcolor="bbffbb"
| 2 || May 11 || 10:30am || Connecticut || 89-84 (3OT) || Greene, Pondexter (14) || Pondexter (11) || Pondexter (8) || Madison Square Garden  19,763 || 1-1
|-

Regular season

|- align="center" bgcolor="bbffbb"
| 1 || May 16 || 4:00pm || Chicago || NBATVMSGCN100 || 85-82 || Pondexter (22) || McCarville (6) || Mitchell (9) || Madison Square Garden  12,088 || 1-0
|- align="center" bgcolor="ffbbbb"
| 2 || May 21 || 7:00pm || @ Washington ||  || 61-77 || Pondexter (14) || Powell (7) || Pondexter (8) || Verizon Center  10,158 || 1-1
|- align="center" bgcolor="ffbbbb"
| 3 || May 23 || 4:00pm || Atlanta ||  || 77-86 || Pondexter (21) || McCarville (9) || Mitchell, Pondexter, Powell (5) || Madison Square Garden  9,548 || 1-2
|- align="center" bgcolor="bbffbb"
| 4 || May 28 || 8:00pm || @ San Antonio ||  || 77-71 || Pondexter (21) || McCarville, Powell (7) || Pondexter (7) || AT&T Center  5,293 || 2-2
|-

|- align="center" bgcolor="ffbbbb"
| 5 || June 4 || 7:00pm || @ Connecticut ||  || 68-75 || McCarville, McWilliams-Franklin (14) || McCarville (13) || McCarville (5) || Mohegan Sun Arena  6,493 || 2-3
|- align="center" bgcolor="ffbbbb"
| 6 || June 5 || 7:00pm || @ Indiana ||  || 73-78 || Pondexter (21) || Pondexter (7) || Pondexter (5) || Conseco Fieldhouse  8,090 || 2-4
|- align="center" bgcolor="bbffbb"
| 7 || June 8 || 8:00pm || @ Chicago || CN100 || 85-70 || Pondexter (31) || McWilliams-Franklin (9) || McWilliams-Franklin, Pondexter, Powell (3) || Allstate Arena  2,408 || 3-4
|- align="center" bgcolor="bbffbb"
| 8 || June 11 || 7:30pm || Atlanta ||  || 91-79 || Pondexter (25) || Jackson, McWilliams-Franklin (6) || Pondexter (7) || Madison Square Garden  8,332 || 4-4
|- align="center" bgcolor="ffbbbb"
| 9 || June 12 || 7:00pm || @ Washington || CSN-MA || 65-82 || Pondexter (20) || McCarville (6) || Pondexter (3) || Verizon Center  8,492 || 4-5
|- align="center" bgcolor="ffbbbb"
| 10 || June 18 || 7:30pm || Seattle ||  || 84-92 || Pondexter (24) || Powell (6) || Mitchell (5) || Madison Square Garden  8,883 || 4-6
|- align="center" bgcolor="ffbbbb"
| 11 || June 22 || 7:30pm || Minnesota ||  || 68-75 || Pondexter (16) || Powell (9) || Pondexter (5) || Madison Square Garden  7,537 || 4-7
|- align="center" bgcolor="bbffbb"
| 12 || June 25 || 8:00pm || @ Tulsa || COX || 92-78 || Mitchell (20) || McWilliams-Franklin (11) || McWilliams-Franklin, Powell (6) || BOK Center  4,554 || 5-7
|- align="center" bgcolor="bbffbb"
| 13 || June 27 || 4:00pm || Connecticut || CSN-NE || 77-68 || Pondexter (19) || Powell (10) || McWilliams-Franklin (5) || Madison Square Garden  15,293 || 6-7
|- align="center" bgcolor="bbffbb"
| 14 || June 29 || 10:30pm || @ Los Angeles || NBATVPRIME || 80-68 || Pondexter (19) || McWilliams-Franklin, Powell (7) || Mitchell, Pondexter (5) || STAPLES Center  8,602 || 7-7
|-

|- align="center" bgcolor="ffbbbb"
| 15 || July 3 || 10:00pm || @ Phoenix ||  || 82-97 || Pondexter (21) || McCarville, Pierson, Pondexter (6) || Mitchell (5) || US Airways Center  6,780 || 7-8
|- align="center" bgcolor="ffbbbb"
| 16 || July 6 || 3:00pm || @ Seattle ||  || 70-78 || McWilliams-Franklin (20) || McWilliams-Franklin (10) || Pondexter (5) || KeyArena  11,012 || 7-9
|- align="center" bgcolor="bbffbb"
| 17 || July 11 || 4:00pm || Chicago || MSG || 57-54 || Pondexter (30) || McWilliams-Franklin, Pondexter (8) || McCarville (4) || Madison Square Garden  9,644 || 8-9
|- align="center" bgcolor="bbffbb"
| 18 || July 15 || 12:00pm || Washington ||  || 75-67 || Pondexter (17) || McCarville (12) || Pondexter (7) || Madison Square Garden  18,162 || 9-9
|- align="center" bgcolor="ffbbbb"
| 19 || July 18 || 4:00pm || Indiana || MSG || 81-84 (OT) || Pondexter (40) || McCarville, Pondexter (6) || Pondexter (7) || Madison Square Garden  9,508 || 9-10
|- align="center" bgcolor="bbffbb"
| 20 || July 20 || 8:00pm || @ Connecticut || ESPN2 || 82-74 (OT) || Pondexter (24) || McCarville, Mitchell (8) || Pondexter (6) || Mohegan Sun Arena  6,478 || 10-10
|- align="center" bgcolor="bbffbb"
| 21 || July 23 || 8:30pm || @ Chicago || CN100 || 79-71 || McWilliams-Franklin (18) || Powell (7) || Pondexter (6) || Allstate Arena  5,256 || 11-10
|- align="center" bgcolor="ffbbbb"
| 22 || July 25 || 3:00pm || @ Atlanta || NBATVSSO || 75-82 || Pondexter (26) || Pierson (6) || Pondexter (6) || Philips Arena  7,030 || 11-11
|- align="center" bgcolor="bbffbb"
| 23 || July 27 || 7:30pm || San Antonio || ESPN2 || 77-72 || Greene (17) || Pierson (8) || Mitchell (8) || Madison Square Garden  10,712 || 12-11
|- align="center" bgcolor="bbffbb"
| 24 || July 30 || 7:30pm || Los Angeles ||  || 88-79 || Pondexter (20) || McWilliams-Franklin (9) || Mitchell (5) || Madison Square Garden  14,307 || 13-11
|-

|- align="center" bgcolor="bbffbb"
| 25 || August 1 || 4:00pm || Connecticut || MSG || 71-67 || Pondexter (24) || McCarville, Pierson (6) || Powell (5) || Madison Square Garden  9,341 || 14-11
|- align="center" bgcolor="bbffbb"
| 26 || August 3 || 7:00pm || @ Indiana || FS-I || 82-72 || Powell (20) || McCarville (10) || Pondexter (5) || Conseco Fieldhouse  7,540 || 15-11
|- align="center" bgcolor="bbffbb"
| 27 || August 6 || 7:30pm || Washington ||  || 85-77 || Pondexter (23) || McCarville (5) || Mitchell (6) || Madison Square Garden  11,465 || 16-11
|- align="center" bgcolor="bbffbb"
| 28 || August 8 || 7:00pm || @ Minnesota || NBATVFS-N || 74-72 || Powell (21) || McCarville (8) || Mitchell, Pondexter, Powell (4) || Target Center  9,016 || 17-11
|- align="center" bgcolor="bbffbb"
| 29 || August 13 || 7:00pm || @ Atlanta || SSO || 90-83 || Pondexter (31) || Carson (7) || McWilliams-Franklin (7) || Philips Arena  6,025 || 18-11
|- align="center" bgcolor="bbffbb"
| 30 || August 14 || 7:30pm || Phoenix || NBATVMSG || 107-69 || Pondexter (28) || Pierson (9) || McCarville (6) || Madison Square Garden  9,645 || 19-11
|- align="center" bgcolor="bbffbb"
| 31 || August 17 || 7:30pm || Indiana ||  || 78-57 || Pondexter (19) || McWilliams-Franklin (10) || Pondexter (6) || Madison Square Garden  8,953 || 20-11
|- align="center" bgcolor="bbffbb"
| 32 || August 19 || 7:30pm || Tulsa ||  || 95-85 || Powell (20) || Pierson (8) || Mitchell (8) || Madison Square Garden  8,766 || 21-11
|- align="center" bgcolor="ffbbbb"
| 33 || August 20 || 7:00pm || @ Washington ||  || 74-75 || Pondexter (28) || McCarville, McWilliams-Franklin, Powell (6) || Powell (5) || Verizon Center  13,109 || 21-12
|- align="center" bgcolor="bbffbb"
| 34 || August 22 || 4:00pm || Connecticut || MSG || 88-87 (OT) || Pondexter (31) || Powell (8) || Pondexter (6) || Madison Square Garden  15,989 || 22-12
|-

| All games are viewable on WNBA LiveAccess

Postseason

|- align="center" bgcolor="bbffbb"
| 1 || August 26 || 7:00pm || Indiana || NBATVMSG || 85-73 || Pondexter (28) || McWilliams-Franklin (10) || McCarville (7) || Madison Square Garden  14,624 || 1-0 
|- align="center" bgcolor="ffbbbb"
| 2 || August 29 || 8:00pm || @ Indiana || ESPN2 || 67-75 || Pondexter (24) || McCarville (11) || Mitchell, Pondexter (2) || Conseco Fieldhouse  7,535 || 1-1
|- align="center" bgcolor="bbffbb"
| 3 || September 1 || 7:30pm || Indiana || NBATVMSG || 77-74 || Pondexter (30) || McWilliams-Franklin (11) || McWilliams-Franklin, Mitchell, Pondexter (4) || Madison Square Garden  16,682 || 2-1 
|-

|- align="center" bgcolor="ffbbbb"
| 1 || September 5 || 7:00pm || Atlanta || NBATVMSG || 75-81 || Pondexter (24) || McWilliams-Franklin (11) || Mitchell (6) || Madison Square Garden  14,248 || 0-1 
|- align="center" bgcolor="ffbbbb"
| 2 || September 7 || 7:30pm || @ Atlanta || NBATVMSGFSSO || 93-105 || Pondexter (36) || McWilliams-Franklin (6) || Pondexter (9) || Philips Arena  9,045 || 0-2 
|-

Statistics

Regular season

Awards and honors
Cappie Pondexter was named WNBA Eastern Conference Player of the Week for the week of June 5, 2010.
Cappie Pondexter was named WNBA Eastern Conference Player of the Week for the week of July 17, 2010.
Cappie Pondexter was named WNBA Eastern Conference Player of the Week for the week of July 24, 2010.
Cappie Pondexter was named WNBA Eastern Conference Player of the Week for the week of August 7, 2010.
Cappie Pondexter was named WNBA Eastern Conference Player of the Week for the week of August 14, 2010.
Cappie Pondexter was named WNBA Eastern Conference Player of the Month for August.
Cappie Pondexter was named to the 2010 WNBA All-Star Team as a Team USA starter.
Kalana Greene was named to the All-Rookie Team.
Cappie Pondexter was named to the All-Defensive First Team.
Cappie Pondexter was named to the All-WNBA First Team.
Leilani Mitchell was named the Most Improved Player.

References

External links

New York Liberty seasons
New York
New York Liberty